Constantino Tsallis (born 4 November 1943) is a naturalized Brazilian physicist of Greek descent, working in Rio de Janeiro at Centro Brasileiro de Pesquisas Físicas (CBPF), Brazil.

Biography
Tsallis was born in Greece, and grew up in Argentina, where he studied physics at Instituto Balseiro, in Bariloche. In 1974, he received a Doctorat d'État ès Sciences Physiques degree from the University of Paris-Sud. He moved to Brazil in 1975 with his wife and daughter.

Research
Tsallis is credited with introducing the notion of what is known as Tsallis entropy and Tsallis statistics in his 1988 paper "Possible generalization of Boltzmann–Gibbs statistics" published in the Journal of Statistical Physics. The generalization is considered to be a good candidate for formulating a theory of non-extensive thermodynamics. The resulting theory is not intended to replace Boltzmann–Gibbs statistics, but rather supplement it, such as in the case of anomalous systems characterised by non-ergodicity or metastable states.

One experimental verification of the predictions of Tsallis statistics concerned cold atoms in dissipative optical lattices. Eric Lutz made an analytical prediction in 2003 which was verified in 2006 by  a London team.

Tsallis conjectured in 1999 (Brazilian Journal of Physics 29, 1;  Figure 4): 
That a longstanding quasi-stationary state (QSS) was expected in long-range interacting Hamiltonian systems (one of the core problems of statistical mechanics). This was verified by groups around the world.
That this QSS should be described by Tsallis statistics instead of Boltzmann–Gibbs statistics. This was verified in June 2007 by  Pluchino, Rapisarda and Tsallis (in the last figure, instead of the  Maxwellian (Gaussian) distribution of velocities (valid for short-range interactions), one sees a q-Gaussian).

References

External links 
 Homepage of Constantino Tsallis
 The regularly updated link to the literature of nonextensive statistics

Greek emigrants to Brazil
Argentine people of Greek descent
1943 births
Living people
Brazilian physicists
Members of the Brazilian Academy of Sciences
Naturalized citizens of Brazil
Commanders of the National Order of Scientific Merit (Brazil)
Santa Fe Institute people
National University of Cuyo alumni
University of Paris alumni
20th-century Brazilian physicists